The 2007 Maryland Terrapins football team represented the University of Maryland in the 2007 NCAA Division I FBS football season. It was the Terrapins' 55th season as a member of the Atlantic Coast Conference (ACC) and its third within the ACC's Atlantic Division. Ralph Friedgen led the team for his seventh season as head coach, and also performed the duties of offensive coordinator. Chris Cosh served for the second season as the team's defensive coordinator. Maryland lost three close games, but gained bowl eligibility with six wins. In the postseason, the Terrapins lost to Oregon State in the 2007 Emerald Bowl.

Schedule

Coaching staff

Roster

Depth chart

Statistics

Passing

Rushing

Receiving

2008 NFL draft
The following players were selected in the 2008 NFL Draft.

At the end of the season, Erin Henderson declared himself eligible for the 2008 NFL Draft; he was signed by the Vikings as an undrafted free agent.

References

Maryland
Maryland Terrapins football seasons
Maryland Terrapins football